The 2023 New Zealand general election to determine the composition of the 54th Parliament of New Zealand is planned to be held on 14 October 2023, after the currently elected 53rd Parliament is dissolved or expires. Voters will elect 120 members to the unicameral New Zealand House of Representatives under the mixed-member proportional (MMP) voting system, a proportional representation system in which 72 members will be elected from single-member electorates and 48 members from closed party lists.

At the 2020 election, the centre-left Labour Party, led by Prime Minister Jacinda Ardern, won an outright majority in the House, resulting in the first time under MMP that a party has been able to form a government without needing a coalition. Nonetheless, Labour formed a co-operation agreement with the Green Party. The main opponent to the Labour government is the centre-right National Party, led by Christopher Luxon, along with ACT New Zealand and Te Pāti Māori.

Background 

The previous general election held on 17 October 2020 resulted in a majority for the Labour Party, winning 65 seats, allowing them to continue the Sixth Labour Government unrestricted in the 53rd Parliament. Their coalition partner from the 52nd Parliament, New Zealand First, did not receive enough votes to pass the five percent threshold or win in an electorate, removing them from Parliament. Confidence and supply partner the Green Party received 10 seats, up two, becoming the first minor party ever to increase their share of the vote following a term in government. In the opposition, the National Party lost 23 seats, giving them a total of 33, and ACT New Zealand went from one seat to ten. Te Pāti Māori won a Māori electorate and gained an additional list seat after losing representation in the 2017 general election.

In a by-election held on 10 December 2022 National gained one seat from Labour.

Electoral system 

New Zealand uses a mixed-member proportional (MMP) voting system to elect the House of Representatives. Each voter gets two votes, one for a political party (the party vote) and one for a local candidate (the electorate vote). Political parties that meet the threshold (5% of the party vote or one electorate seat) receive seats in the House in proportion to the percentage of the party vote they receive. 72 of the 120 seats are filled by the MPs elected from the electorates, with the winner in each electorate determined by the first-past-the-post method (i.e. most votes wins). The remaining 48 seats are filled by candidates from each party's closed party list. If a party wins more electorates than seats it is entitled to under the party vote, an overhang results; in this case, the House will add extra seats to cover the overhang.

The political party or party bloc with the majority of the seats in the House forms the Government. Since the introduction of MMP in 1996, no party had won enough votes to win an outright majority of seats, until the landslide 2020 Labour victory, which gave them 65 seats.  When no party has commanded a majority, parties have had to negotiate with other parties to form a coalition government or a minority government. Some 2022 polls indicate that Te Pāti Māori could be kingmaker in 2023, being prepared to give a majority to either Labour or National. Te Pāti Māori may not be prepared to be in a coalition with both ACT and National after comments by David Seymour of ACT objecting to "co-governance" with Māori.

With 120, or 121 seats with an overhang of one seat, a party or coalition, such as a minority government with a confidence and supply agreement, requires 61 seats for a majority in Parliament. With two extra overhang seats in Parliament 62 seats would be required, but this has only happened once; in 2008. The Māori Party had two overhang seats in 2008, and one in 2005 and 2011. While other parties have returned to Parliament with less than 5% of the party vote by winning an electorate seat (eg ACT in 2005, 2008, 2011, 2014, and  2017), this did not result in overhang seats. 

Electorate boundaries for the election will be the same as at the 2020 election, with 65 general electorates (49 in the North Island and 16 in the South Island), and 7 Māori electorates. Boundaries are due to be redrawn in 2024, after the 2023 census.

Election date and schedule 
Unless an early election is called or the election date is set to circumvent holding a by-election, a general election is held every three years. The previous election was held on 17 October 2020.

The governor-general must issue writs for an election within seven days of the expiration or dissolution of the current parliament. Under section 17 of the Constitution Act 1986, parliament expires three years "from the day fixed for the return of the writs issued for the last preceding general election of members of the House of Representatives, and no longer." The writs for the 2020 election were returned on 20 November 2020; as a result, the 53rd Parliament must dissolve no later than 20 November 2023. Writs must be issued within seven days, so the last day for issuance of the writs is 27 November 2023. Writs must be returned within 60 days of their issuance (save for any judicial recount, death of a candidate, or emergency adjournment), which would be 26 January 2024. Because polling day must be on a Saturday, and ten days is required for the counting of special votes, the last possible date for the next election to be held is 13 January 2024.

However, it is widely accepted by political commentators, news media and the Electoral Commission that the next election will be held in late 2023. News website Stuff, as part of its annual political predictions, predicted that the election would be in November so as not to coincide with the New Zealand co-hosted 2023 FIFA Women’s World Cup which finishes in August and the 2023 Men's Rugby World Cup which finishes in October.

On 19 January 2023, Prime Minister Jacinda Ardern announced Saturday 14 October 2023 as the election date. The indicative schedule for the election is as follows:

Parties and candidates 

Political parties registered with the Electoral Commission can contest the general election as a party. To register, parties must have at least 500 financial members, an auditor, and an appropriate party name. A registered party may submit a party list to contest the party vote, and can have a party campaign expenses limit in addition to limits on individual candidates' campaigns. Unregistered parties and independents can contest the electorate vote only.

Since the 2020 election, five parties have been deregistered: Mana on 5 May 2021, Advance New Zealand on 19 August 2021, Sustainable NZ on 15 December 2021, New Zealand TEA Party on 21 September 2022, and New Zealand Social Credit Party on 28 February 2023.

MPs not standing for re-election

MPs standing for re-election as list-only MPs

Fundraising
On 18 January 2023, The New Zealand Herald reported that the National Party had raised NZ$2.3 million to fund their 2023 election campaign from 24 big donors in 2022. The ACT Party also raised NZ$1.1 million in large donations in 2022. By comparison, the incumbent Labour Party had raised NZ$150,000 during that same period including a NZ$50,000 donation from the family of Les Mills gym owner Phillip Mills.  In addition, the Green Party raised NZ$122,000 through tithes from co-leaders James Shaw and Marama Davidson. Finally, the New Zealand First party received a NZ$35,000 donation from Tom Bowker.

Opinion polls 

Several polling firms have conducted opinion polls during the term of the 53rd New Zealand Parliament (2020–present) for the 2023 general election. The regular polls are the quarterly polls produced by Television New Zealand (1 News) conducted by Kantar Public (formerly known as Colmar Brunton) and Discovery New Zealand (Newshub) conducted by Reid Research, along with monthly polls by Roy Morgan Research, and by Curia (Taxpayers' Union). The sample size, margin of error and confidence interval of each poll varies by organisation and date.

Seat projections

See also 
 Elections in New Zealand

References

External links 
Electoral Commission website

 
General elections in New Zealand
2023 elections in New Zealand